= Esmaltina =

Esmaltina is a Portuguese bicycle manufacturer founded in 1970 in Sangalhos, in the municipality of Anadia, Portugal. It became one of the largest bicycle manufacturers in Portugal and was historically among the most significant companies in the bicycle industry cluster of the Águeda and Anadia region.

Over its history, Esmaltina produced and exported more than three million bicycles to markets across Europe, including Spain, France, and the United Kingdom, as well as to Africa and South America. At its peak, the company manufactured approximately 200,000 bicycles per year, primarily for the Iberian market.

In January 2022, a major fire destroyed the company's main production pavilion in Sangalhos, causing extensive damage to its manufacturing facilities. The fire mobilized more than 90 emergency responders and effectively devastated the factory's production capacity. Following the disaster, Esmaltina filed for insolvency, and the Commercial Court of Aveiro officially declared the company insolvent in February 2022.

The insolvency marked the end of one of Portugal's oldest bicycle manufacturers and represented a significant loss for the historic bicycle and motorcycle manufacturing industry that once thrived in the Águeda–Anadia region.
